Goodwood Primary School is a primary school in the Adelaide inner southern suburb of Goodwood, South Australia. It currently has an enrolment of around 400 students. Goodwood Primary School offers Reception - Year 7. In 2022, they will be discontinuing Year 7. The Year 7's get special Year 7 jumpers and Year 7 tops which they can personalise themselves. The Goody Patch is 250 metres away from the school's campus, and is used as a local community garden but is also owned by school staff.

References

External links
 

Primary schools in South Australia
Educational institutions established in 1879
1879 establishments in Australia